Danilo Petrolli Bueno (born 27 December 1983 in Monte Alegre do Sul, Sao Paulo, Brazil) is a Brazilian footballer who plays as a midfielder for XV de Novembro.

Career
He can play in different positions in the Midfield (Centre Midfielder, Deep-lying playmaker, Playmaker, Attacking Midfielfer, Side Midfielder).
In the 2008-2009 Brazilian Série B season he was chosen as the best player of the second period.

In June 2010, he signed a 4 years deal contract with African club Étoile Sportive du Sahel (Tunisia) for a total amount of $950 000.
Before signing with Étoile Sportive du Sahel he had received some contracts from Italian sides like Reggina Calcio, Calcio Catania, and the Brazilian side of São Paulo FC.

References

External links
Profile at Globo Esporte's Futpedia

1983 births
Living people
Brazilian footballers
Brazilian expatriate footballers
Associação Portuguesa de Desportos players
Esporte Clube Vitória players
Clube Atlético Bragantino players
Étoile Sportive du Sahel players
Mersin İdman Yurdu footballers
Botafogo Futebol Clube (SP) players
Associação Desportiva São Caetano players
Süper Lig players
Al-Ittihad Kalba SC players
AEL Limassol players
Cypriot First Division players
Riffa SC players
Bahraini Premier League players
Esporte Clube XV de Novembro (Piracicaba) players
Expatriate footballers in Cyprus
Expatriate footballers in Tunisia
Expatriate footballers in Turkey
Association football midfielders
UAE Pro League players